Thu Zar Htwe (born 30 November 1984) is a Burmese footballer who plays as a midfielder. She has been a member of the Myanmar women's national team.

International career
Thu Zar Htwe capped for Myanmar at senior level during the 2010 AFC Women's Asian Cup.

References

1984 births
Living people
Burmese women's footballers
Women's association football midfielders
Myanmar women's international footballers
Burmese women's futsal players
Burmese football managers
Women's association football managers
Female association football managers